Erin Paige Mikalsen (born 21 June 1999) is an American-born Jamaican footballer who plays as a defender for the Jamaica women's national team.

References 

1999 births
Living people
Citizens of Jamaica through descent
Jamaican women's footballers
Women's association football defenders
Jamaica women's international footballers
Jamaican people of Norwegian descent
American women's soccer players
Soccer players from Orlando, Florida
People from Oviedo, Florida
East Carolina Pirates women's soccer players
Women's Premier Soccer League players
African-American women's soccer players
American sportspeople of Jamaican descent
American people of Norwegian descent
21st-century African-American sportspeople
21st-century African-American women